, abbreviated as "TKJ", is a railway operating company in Aichi Prefecture, Japan. It is a subsidiary of Central Japan Railway Company (JR Central).

Lines
TKJ operates only one line, the 11.2 km Johoku Line. The rail facilities are operated by JR Central, and the trains are run by TKJ.

History
The company was founded on 18 February 1988.

References

External links
  

Companies based in Aichi Prefecture
Lines of Central Japan Railway Company
Rail transport in Aichi Prefecture
Japanese companies established in 1988